Aporocosmus is a genus of moths in the subfamily Odontiinae of the family Crambidae. It contains only one species, Aporocosmus lamprodeta, which is found in New Guinea and Australia, where it has been recorded from Western Australia, the Northern Territory, Queensland and New South Wales.

References

Odontiinae
Taxa named by Arthur Gardiner Butler
Monotypic moth genera
Moths of Oceania
Crambidae genera